Wolter Kroes (born in Wormerveer, Netherlands on 24 December 1968) is a Dutch singer. He is best known for his hits Ik heb de hele nacht liggen dromen, Niet normaal and his hit single Viva Hollandia that reached #1 in the Dutch Top 40 in 2008.

Discography

Albums
(Peak position in Dutch Albums Chart)
1994: Laat me los (#58)	
1998: De wereld in (-)			
2000: Niemand anders (#67)	
 2000 Jij Bent Alles Voor Mij (-)	
2002: 24 Uur per dag (#56)	
2005: Laat me zweven (#8)	
2006: Langzaam (#7)	
2008: Echt niet normaal! (#15)
2011: Feest met Wolter Kroes (#89)	
2011: Tussen jou en mij (#11)
2016: Formidabel (#15)	
Live albums
2003: Het beste Live (#96)
2005: Live in Ahoy (#32)

Singles
(Selective. Peak positions in Dutch Singles Chart in parenthesis)
1995: "Laat me los" (#38)
2000: "Jij bent alles voor mij" (#37)
2005: "Laat me zweven" (#30)
2007: "Niet normaal" (#4)
2008: "Donker om je heen" (#14)
2008: "Viva Hollandia" (EK 2008 versie) (#1) (on occasion of UEFA Euro 2008)
2010: "Viva Hollandia" (WK 2010 versie) (#21) (on occasion of the 2010 FIFA World Cup)
2012: "Ben je ook voor Nederland? - De geluksvogeltjesdans" (#3)
2017: "Vannacht" met StukTV

DVDs
2003: Wolter Kroes Live in concert in de Heineken Music Hall2005: Live in Ahoy2006: Uit en thuis'' - Documentary film about Wolter Kroes

References

External links

1968 births
Living people
Dutch male singers
People from Zaanstad
21st-century Dutch male singers